Solidago perornata is a rare North American plant species in the family Asteraceae. It is native to the state of North Dakota in the north-central United States. It was first described in 1911 from specimens collected near Turtle Mountains in Rolette County.

Solidago perornata is a perennial herb up to 100 cm (40 inches) tall. Leaves are lance-shaped. The plant produces flower heads in a one-sided display at the top of the stem.''

References

perornata
Flora of North Dakota
Plants described in 1911
Flora without expected TNC conservation status